Atelerix is a genus of hedgehog in the family Erinaceidae. It contains four species, all native to Africa.

Species
 Four-toed hedgehog (Atelerix albiventris)
 North African hedgehog (Atelerix algirus)
 Southern African hedgehog (Atelerix frontalis)
 Somali hedgehog (Atelerix sclateri)

The Atelerix diversified from its family because of geographical isolation during Pleistocene climate changes. This being a type of vicariance separation from the Niger River. This allowed the Erinaceidane family to be more diverse.

References

 
Mammal genera
 
Taxa named by Auguste Pomel
Taxonomy articles created by Polbot